Somebody may refer to:

Music

Albums
 Somebody, by Connie Dover, 1991
 Somebody, by Philip Michael Thomas, 1988

Songs
 "Somebody" (Aerosmith song), 1973
 "Somebody" (Bonnie McKee song), 2004
 "Somebody" (Bridgit Mendler song), 2011
 "Somebody" (Bryan Adams song), 1985
 "Somebody" (The Chainsmokers song), 2018
 "Somebody" (Depeche Mode song), 1984
 "Somebody" (Internet Money song), 2019
 "Somebody" (Mark Wills song), 2001; covered by Reba McEntire, 2004
 "Somebody" (Natalie La Rose song), 2014
 "Somebody", by 15&, 2013
 "Somebody", by A Boogie wit da Hoodie from The Bigger Artist, 2017
 "Somebody", by AJ Mitchell, 2018
 "Somebody", by Bazzi from Cosmic, 2018
 "Somebody", by Black Legend, 2001
 "Somebody", by Blue October from History for Sale, 2003
 "Somebody", by Dagny from Strangers / Lovers, 2020
 "Somebody", by the Eagles from Long Road Out of Eden, 2007
 "Some Body", by Jonna Lee from Remember the Future, 2019
 "Somebody", by Justin Bieber from Justice, 2021
 "Somebody", by Sigala from Brighter Days, 2018
 "Somebody", by the Stargazers, 1955

Other uses
 John Neal (writer) (1793–1876), pen name Somebody, M.D.C., American writer and activist
 Somebody (podcast), an American true-crime podcast
 Somebody, a 2009 novel by Nancy Springer
 Somebody, a 2014 iOS app created by Miranda July
 Somebody, an indefinite pronoun
 Somebody (TV series), a 2022 South Korean television series

See also
 
 Someone (disambiguation)